Alice K. Jacobs is a professor at the Boston University Chobanian & Avedisian School of Medicine who specializes in interventional cardiology, coronary revascularization, and sex-based differences in cardiovascular disease.  

She holds a BA from State University of New York at Buffalo and an MD from Saint Louis University School of Medicine.  At BU, she was Director of the Cardiac Catheterization Laboratories and Interventional Cardiology for 20 years until 2011. She currently is Vice Chair for Clinical Affairs in the Department of Medicine at Boston University Medical Center and maintains an active clinical practice.

Jacobs was President of the American Heart Association (2004 - 2005). She has also served as chair of the American College of Cardiology/American Heart Association Task Force on Practice Guidelines. On April 20, 2009, she was awarded the Gold Heart Award by the American Heart Association for her contributions to health. She was president of the Association of University Cardiologists in 2011.  She is a Master Fellow of the Society for Cardiovascular Angiography and Interventions (SCAI).   She is a Fellow of the American Heart Association and the American College of Cardiology.

Works

References

Boston University faculty
Physicians from Massachusetts
American cardiologists
Women cardiologists
Year of birth missing (living people)
Living people
American women academics

Fellows of the American College of Cardiology
Fellows of the American Heart Association
American medical academics
Women medical researchers
University at Buffalo alumni
Saint Louis University alumni